Two human polls comprised the 1961 NCAA University Division football rankings. Unlike most sports, college football's governing body, the NCAA, does not bestow a national championship, instead that title is bestowed by one or more different polling agencies. There are two main weekly polls that begin in the preseason—the AP Poll and the Coaches Poll.

Legend

AP Poll
The final AP Poll was released on December 5, at the end of the 1961 regular season, weeks before the bowls. Starting in the 1961 season and until the 1967 season, The AP Poll ranked only 10 teams.

Final Coaches Poll
The final UPI Coaches Poll was released prior to the bowl games, on December 5.
Alabama received 18 of the 35 first-place votes; Ohio State received fifteen, Ole Miss one, and Colorado one.

 Prior to the 1975 season, the Big Ten and AAWU (later Pac-8) conferences allowed only one postseason participant each, for the Rose Bowl.
 The Ivy League has prohibited its members from participating in postseason football since the league was officially formed in 1954.

References

College football rankings